Afra Kati va Lu Kola (also Romanized as Afrā Katī va Lūkolā; also known as Afrā Katī) is a village in Gatab-e Jonubi Rural District, Gatab District, Babol County, Mazandaran Province, Iran. At the 2006 census, its population was 191, in 46 families.

References 

Populated places in Babol County